Daniel David Taylor (born May 23, 1938) is an American nature protection specialist. He was the head of the resources management department at Hawaii Volcanoes National Park from 1979–1996, and is known for his environmental activities in Africa, Asia, California and Hawaii.

Early life and education 
Born in 1938 in Santa Fe, New Mexico, his father worked in government Taylor's family lived in New Mexico before moving to Colorado in 1941 and Sonoma, California in 1948.

Taylor attended San Francisco State University from 1956 to 1960 and the University of California, Berkeley. The main subject was cultural geography which included history, cultures, anthropology and regional geography.

Career 
After college, Taylor volunteered to teach geography for the Ugandan children in Africa for five years, in a catholic mission school near Kampala.

National Park Service 
He started to work in Yosemite National Park (1968) in the Resources Management Department.

His job was to restore natural conditions to the forest and in the Yosemite. It included bringing fires in the forest. The forest was overgrown and full of pests and weeds and little trees couldn’t grow because there was no fire in 150 years. So they developed a prescription for burning which allowed us to burn the undergrowth without killing the mature trees periodically and that program is still evolving, but he and his colleagues started that program in Yosemite which then spread to other national parks on the west and then he transferred to the Sequoia National Park to develop a fire program even further there.

He worked with a researcher Bruce M. Kilgore and they continued the burning research programs in some other national parks such as Yosemite, Sequoia, Grand Canyon, North Cascades in Washington state, where he was in charge of the back country program. Then he transferred to the Glaciers National Park. Daniel and his colleagues had to pay close attention to the condition of the fuel, so it would only burn dead wood, small trees, the grasses and all things which were there and shouldn’t have been. He was studying how flammable they were and looked at the conditions of the weather before burning so that if they start a fire, they could control it and the fire would burn only what they want it to burn, so they had to fit a very tight prescription at first. They found that as soon as the fuels were safely removed they could go there a few years later and not pay so much attention. For example: they take a slope for several square miles and burn spots in that slope so that the heavy fuels were reduced and they would have several safer spots to burn in. They burnt spots, they burnt areas where the fuel was especially dangerous. They controlled fire and let the fire burn down because the flames moved downhill much slower, then they could come several years later and repeat this. During a couple of years they were able to burn out all of the meadows in Yosemite Valley and open up the views again, so the tourists could see the cliffs and the waterfalls more clearly and to get rid of the undergrowth that will come in over the years and restore the native grasses to Yosemite valley.

They learned that in the ancient times Indians did exactly the same thing, but their fuels were already reduced so they didn’t have to worry about these weather conditions and slope and all of it, they just started fires for thousands of years. They were essentially copying what they did but with the help of more modern fuels. This restored natural processes in the National parks.

His photo published in National Geographic

Hawaii 

Don Reeser had transferred to Redwoods National Park, Dan Taylor succeeded him as Resources Management Division Chief in Hawaii Volcanoes National Park in fall 1979. He was put in charge of the natural resources management program, but it had nothing to do with fire. The main problem was controlling feral pigs, goats and other wild cattle and invasive plants. He spent the next 28 years working in this program, hoping to remove the goats and pigs which came in and helping to put back native plants which have practically disappeared from the system and also putting back some of the rare animals.

He was a head of Resources Management Department, Hawaii Volcanoes National Park. He managed to solve environmental problems with interaction and cooperation between the park, state agencies, other federal agencies, private organizations, and the general public. There were problems such as endangered species and habitat protection, feral ungulate and exotic plant control, geothermal development, air quality, cave management and others in the National parks.

He and Larry Katahira (Wildlife Specialist) developed new method of monitoring feral goats using radio-collared devices. They use it to tracking feral goats for purposes of removing remnant groups.

He managed international research programs as part of the National Park Service "Volunteers in a Park" program.

Retired in 1996 and continued nature protection activities in Asia, Africa, then on the island of Hawaii, mostly around the community of Volcano.

Awards 
 1991: NPS Award for Natural Resource Management

Organizations 
Member of several organizations:
 Amnesty International
 Sierra Club
 WWF

Bibliography 
 Kilgore B. M., Taylor D. D. Fire history of a sequoia mixed conifer forest // Ecology. 1979. Vol. 60. P. 129–142.
 Taylor D. Controlling exotic plants in Hawaii Volcanoes National Park // Proceedings, Third Conference in Natural Sciences, Hawaii Volcanoes National Park. Hawaii Field Research Center, 1980 P. 349-354.
 Stone C. P., Taylor D. D. Status of feral pig management and research in Hawaii Volcanoes National Park // Cooperative National Park Resources Studies. University of Hawaii at Manoa, 1982. P. 106-117.
 Stone C. P., Taylor D. D. Status of feral pig management and research in Hawaii Volcanoes National Park // Smith C.W editor. Proceedings of the Fifth Conference in Natural Sciences Hawaii Volcanoes National Park: [Honolulu. June 5–7, 1984]. University of Hawaii at Manoa. 1984. P. 106—117.
 Taylor D., Stone C. P. Controlling feral pigs in Hawaii Volcanoes National Park // Conference of Scientific Research of National Parks. 1986. Vol. 4. P. 193. (abstract).
 Taylor D., Katahira L. Radio telemetry as an aid in eradicating remnant feral goats // Wildl. Soc. Bull. 1988. Vol. 16. P. 297—299.
 Taylor D. Managing the people's cave in Hawaii Volcanoes National Park // Geo. 1991. Vol. 19. N 1. P. 28.
 Taylor D. Restoring endangered species in Hawaii Volcanoes National Park // Endangered species technical bulletin. 1994. Vol. 19. N 2. P. 18-19.

 Literature 
 Vtorov I. P. Feral pig removal: Effect on soil microarthropods in a Hawaiian rain forest // Journal of Wildlife Management. 1993. Vol 57. N 4. P. 875—880. DOI:10.2307/3809092
 Второв И. П. Чужие среди своих // Зелёный мир: Еженедельная экологическая газета. 1992. № 9/10 (74). С. 13.
 Vtorov I. P. Restoration of Soil Microarthropod Populations after Feral Pig Removal in a Hawaiian Rainforest Ecosystem // Pacific Science. Vol. 46, October 1992. P. 398—399.
 Vtorov I. P.'' The effect of feral pigs on soil invertebrate complexes in a Hawaiian rain forest // Towards the Pacific century: The challenge of change: 17th Pacific Science Congress: [Honolulu. 27 May — 2 June 1991]. Honolulu: PSC, 1991. P. 145.

See also 
 Hugo Huntzinger

References

External links

 The Pig War: A small army of hunters struggles to control one of Hawaii's most destructive exotic pests. by Kenneth Brower, August, 1985.
 Dan Taylor of Volcano, permanently protected three acres of land in the Royal Hawaiian Estates subdivision of Volcano — Hawaiian Islands Land Trust, 2015.
 Kipuka Mosaic Project — Taylor, Volcano. The Hawaiian Islands Land Trust land conservancy organization.

1938 births
People from Hawaii
American environmentalists
National Park Service personnel
San Francisco State University alumni
University of California, Berkeley alumni
American expatriates in Uganda
People from Santa Fe, New Mexico
People from Sonoma, California
Living people